The 1946–47 Ohio Bobcats men's basketball team represented Ohio University in the college basketball season of 1946–47. The team was coached by Dutch Trautwein and played their home games at the Men's Gymnasium.  They finished the season 11–8.  This was Ohio's first year in the newly created Mid-American Conference. They finished third in the MAC with a conference record of 5–3.

Schedule

|-
!colspan=9 style=| Regular Season

 Source:

References

Ohio Bobcats men's basketball seasons
Ohio
1946 in sports in Ohio
1947 in sports in Ohio